Protein C-ETS2 is a protein that in humans is encoded by the ETS2 gene.  The protein encoded by this gene belongs to the ETS family of transcription factors.

Interactions 

ETS2 has been shown to interact with:

 C-jun,
 Cyclin-dependent kinase 10,
 ERG,
 myb, and
 ZMYND11.

References

Further reading

External links 
 Drosophila pointed - The Interactive Fly

Transcription factors